XEFD-AM (590 kHz) is a Regional Mexican radio station that serves the McAllen, Texas (USA) / Reynosa, Tamaulipas (Mexico) border area.

History
XEFD received its concession on May 11, 1953. It was owned by José María Villarreal Montemayor. The station was sold to the current concessionaire in 1981 and doubled its nighttime power in 1990.

External links
 Official website
 Grupo Gape Radio

References

Radio stations in Reynosa